The 1992 season was the 72nd season of competitive football (soccer) in Estonia, and the first one in the Baltic country as an independent nation. The Estonia national football team under the guidance of manager Uno Piir played its first FIFA-recognized match after the restoration of independence against Slovenia on June 3, 1992: a 1-1 draw in the capital Tallinn. The team played a total number of five official matches in the year 1992, including two qualifiers for the 1994 FIFA World Cup in the United States.

Estonia vs Slovenia

Latvia vs Estonia

Lithuania vs Estonia

Estonia vs Switzerland

Malta vs Estonia

Notes

References
 RSSSF detailed results
 RSSSF detailed results

1992
Estonia
National